Takanobashi is a Hiroden station (tram stop) on Hiroden Ujina Line located in Senda-machi 1-chome, Naka-ku, Hiroshima.

Routes
From Takanobashi Station, there are three of Hiroden Streetcar routes.

 Hiroshima Station - Hiroshima Port Route
 Hiroden-nishi-hiroshima - Hiroshima Port Route
 Yokogawa Station - Hiroden-honsha-mae Route

Connections
█ Ujina Line
  
Shiyakusho-mae — Takanobashi — Nisseki-byoin-mae

Other services connections

Hiroshima Bus services routes
Route #21 and #21-1 at "Takanobashi" bus stop
Route #21-1 at "Minami-takanobashi" bus stop
Route #21-2 at "Takanobashi-syoutengai" bus stop

Around station
Takanobashi Syoutengai
Hiroshima Takanobashi Post Office
Takanobashi Central Hospital
Hiroshima Accounting Academy
Hiroshima Salon Cinema

History
Opened as "Takano-bashi" tram stop, named from the bridge "Takano", on November 23, 1914.

See also
Hiroden Streetcar Lines and Routes

References 

Takanobashi Station
Railway stations in Japan opened in 1914